is a Japanese wrestler. He competed at the 1988 Summer Olympics and the 1992 Summer Olympics.

References

External links
 

1964 births
Living people
Japanese male sport wrestlers
Olympic wrestlers of Japan
Wrestlers at the 1988 Summer Olympics
Wrestlers at the 1992 Summer Olympics
Sportspeople from Hokkaido
Asian Games medalists in wrestling
Wrestlers at the 1994 Asian Games
Medalists at the 1994 Asian Games
Asian Games silver medalists for Japan
20th-century Japanese people
21st-century Japanese people